

People 
 Jacob B. Sweitzer (1821–1881),  a Pennsylvania  lawyer and soldier
 Morgan Sweitzer (1891–1953), was a Colorado fruit cultivator
 Sandi Sweitzer (1946 - ), was an American  figure skater

Places 
 4194 Sweitzer, a main-belt asteroid
 Sweitzer Hills,  in northern Yolo County, California
 Sweitzer Lake State Park, a Colorado State Park